Broager Peninsula is a peninsula and cultural region in southern Denmark. The peninsula consists entirely of the former Broager Municipality. The peninsula has an area of 43,38 km² and a population of 6,203.
The namesake, and largest town of the peninsula is Broager.

References

Broager
Peninsulas of Denmark